The 2009 Jarama Superleague Formula round was the sixth round and last of the 2009 Superleague Formula season, with the races taking place on November 8, 2009.

Report

Qualifying
For the final round of the year, 4 time Champ Car World Series champion and Formula One pointscorer Sébastien Bourdais clinched his first pole position in the Superleague Formula series.

Race 1
At the start of the race FC Midtjylland (Kasper Andersen) and Rangers F.C. (John Martin) both ran off into the gravel trap at turn 1. This left FC Midtjylland stuck and Rangers F.C.s race severely compromised. Olympiacos CFP (Esteban Guerrieri) lost it on the exit of the corner, spinning out and nearly hitting the barrier, they rejoined the race within seconds. Atlético Madrid (María de Villota) spun out of the race on lap 2. Galatasaray S.K. (Ho-Pin Tung) were in 3rd place in the opening stage of the race before going straight on at turn 1 with reported brake failure. Sevilla FC (Sébastien Bourdais) built up a comfortable 3 second lead in the opening stage of the race, but spun the car before the first round of pit stops - amazingly still keeping his lead. Sevilla FC went to the pits one lap before R.S.C. Anderlecht (Yelmer Buurman) and when Anderlecht came out from their pit stop the two teams went side by side into the first corner. The Sevilla FC mysteriously slowed up midcorner giving R.S.C. Anderlecht a lead they would never relinquish, finishing ahead of Sevilla by 14 seconds. A.C. Milan (Giorgio Pantano) clinched the last podium spot. A couple of laps before the end of the race SC Corinthians (Antônio Pizzonia) suffered a suspected puncture after making contact with A.S. Roma which led to A.S. Roma (Julien Jousse) crashing into the back of him, while FC Basel 1893 (Max Wissel) had to take avoiding action allowing title challenger Tottenham Hotspur
(Craig Dolby) to pass 3 cars to keep his slim title bid alive. Both A.S. Roma and SC Corinthians were given grid penalties for the 2nd race of the day.

Race 2

At the start of the race there were more problems. Olympiacos CFP (Esteban Guerrieri) locked up and went into the side of PSV Eindhoven (Carlo van Dam) and caused mayhem. Rangers F.C. (John Martin) had to take avoiding action and went into the gravel again. Several other cars had to take avoiding action including Tottenham Hotspur (Craig Dolby) and FC Basel 1893 (Max Wissel). SC Corinthians (Antônio Pizzonia) also got tangled up in the mess and were the only retirement on the opening lap with PSV Eindhoven.

Galatasaray S.K. (Ho-Pin Tung) passed FC Midtjylland (Kasper Andersen) on the restart. The race had several passes by the Tottenham Hotspur car including one on Sevilla FC (Sébastien Bourdais). When the pit stop window opened there was a crash in the pits when R.S.C. Anderlecht (Yelmer Buurman) and Olympique Lyonnais (Nelson Panciatici) collided. Race 1 winner R.S.C. Anderlecht was out the race from the incident.

In the end Galatasaray S.K. came home the winners for their first ever Superleague Formula win, Tottenham Hotspur finished 2nd and FC Midtjylland got their first Superleague Formula podium. Liverpool F.C. (Adrián Vallés) were crowned the 2009 champions.

Super Final
The 100,000 Euro Super Final was the last race of the season. Polesitter Tottenham Hotspur (Craig Dolby) stalled and were effectively out of the race at the start, coming in at the finish 6th and last some way behind. F.C. Porto (Tristan Gommendy) outbraked himself at the first corner and finished 5th. R.S.C. Anderlecht (Yelmer Buurman) jumped up from 5th to 1st at the first corner and would never give up the lead and won the race. Sevilla FC (Sébastien Bourdais) finished 2nd and the new champions Liverpool F.C. (Adrián Vallés) finished 3rd.

Results

Qualifying
 In each group, the top four qualify for the quarter-finals.

Group A

Group B

Knockout stages

Grid

Race 1

Race 2

Super Final

References

External links
 Official results from the Superleague Formula website

Jarama
Superleague Formula